The 1986 Railway Cup Hurling Championship was the 60th staging of the Railway Cup since its establishment by the Gaelic Athletic Association in 1927. The cup began on 16 February 1986 and ended on 17 March 1986.

Munster were the defending champions.

On 17 March 1986, Connacht won the cup after a 3-11 to 0-11 defeat of Connacht in the final at Duggan Park. This was their fifth Railway Cup title overall and their first title since 1983.

Results

Semi-finals

Final

Scoring statistics

Top scorers overall

Bibliography

 Donegan, Des, The Complete Handbook of Gaelic Games (DBA Publications Limited, 2005).

References

Railway Cup Hurling Championship
Railway Cup Hurling Championship
Hurling